Gravity's Rim is the fifth studio album by the American experimental music band Vampire Rodents, released on May 14, 1996 by Fifth Colvmn Records.

Music and lyrics
Gravity's Rim returns to the pop format of the band's earlier albums as well as a more jazz oriented sound similar to Daniel Vahnke's Ether Bunny project. There are fewer guest vocalists compared to the previous album, with the focus shifting back to Vahnke's vocals and lyrics. Former collaborators contributed their vocals to the music, including Maria Azevedo, Boom chr Paige, Dave Creadeau, Mark Edwards and Jared Louche. Spahn Ranch vocalist Athan Maroulis also contributed vocals to four songs. Daniel was so pleased with Maria Azevedo's contributions that he considered starting a separate project with her band Battery.

Release and reception

Despite being listed on the back cover, the track "Smartass" was left off due to the label being ready to press the record before the mastering process had been completed.

AllMusic critic Amy Hanson gave it three out of five stars, calling it "a triumph" and a "remarkable assimilation of sound, sonics, and scope" Aiding & Abetting gave it a positive review, saying "Vahnke has managed to vary his beat work even more (perhaps inspired by his recent Ether Bunny project), making the songs even more intriguing." Black Monday Magazine gave it a positive review as well, noting that "all the classic Rodentia elements are found: heavy beats, cellos, guitar, and it’s chock full of exotic sampling."

Track listing

Personnel
Adapted from the Gravity's Rim liner notes.

Vampire Rodents
 Andrea Akastia – cello
 Daniel Vahnke (as Anton Rathausen) – sampler, guitar, bass guitar, lead vocals (2, 4, 6, 8, 10, 12, 15, 17, 19, 20)
 Victor Wulf – piano, synthesizer, organ

Additional musicians
 Maria Azevedo – lead vocals (5, 11)
 Chase – percussion, loops
 Dave Creadeau – lead vocals (24)
 Mark Edwards – lead vocals (22)
 Jared Louche – lead vocals (3, 9)
 Athan Maroulis – lead vocals (1, 7, 13, 16)
 Boom chr Paige – lead vocals (24)

Production
 Judson Leach – mastering, mixing

Release history

References

External links 
 Gravity's Rim at Bandcamp
 Gravity's Rim at Discogs (list of releases)

1996 albums
Vampire Rodents albums
Fifth Colvmn Records albums